Khanlar Maharramov (1950, Tovuz – 1998, Baku) was a famous  Azerbaijani ashiq.

Ashig Khanlar Maharramov was born in January 1950 in the village of Alimardanli, Tovuz region.

He died in 1998 in Baku.

References 

Azerbaijani folk poets
Azerbaijani poets
1998 deaths
1950 births
20th-century poets
Ashiks